This is a list of episodes of the animated series Super Robot Monkey Team Hyperforce Go!

Series overview

Episodes

Season 1 (2004)

Season 2 (2005)

Season 3 (2005–06)

Season 4 (2006)

External links 
 
 

E
Lists of American children's animated television series episodes
Lists of Disney Channel television series episodes